KQ Puppis (KQ Pup) is a spectroscopic binary variable star in the constellation Puppis.  A red supergiant star and a hot main sequence star orbit each other every 9,742 days.  Its apparent magnitude varies between 4.82 and 5.17.

The KQ Puppis system consists of a fairly typical M2 supergiant, in orbit with a hotter less luminous star.  The hotter star is surrounded by a disc of material being transferred from the cool supergiant.  This type of binary is referred to a VV Cephei system, although in this case there are no eclipses of either star.  A portion of the disc does appear to be eclipsed and this is detected as a strong drop in far-ultraviolet radiation for about a third of the orbit.

The red supergiant primary star has been compared to Betelgeuse.  It shows small amplitude irregular pulsations, and also some variation associated with the orbital motion.  The nature of the secondary is less certain.  The spectrum shows high excitation features that would indicate an early B or hotter spectral type, but these may be associated with the disc rather than that star itself.  Other studies have found a spectrum similar to an A supergiant, but this is thought to be an artefact of a B-type shell star.

KQ Puppis has been catalogued as an outlying member of the open cluster Messier 47 (NGC 2422) and would be the brightest member of that cluster. Membership is uncertain as it appears to be more distant than the other stars in the cluster.

References

Puppis
M-type supergiants
Slow irregular variables
Puppis, KQ
B-type main-sequence stars
Emission-line stars
Spectroscopic binaries
Durchmusterung objects
036773
060414 5
2902